The Eastern European Super League is an international American football tournament that brings together the best clubs from the Russian Federation and the Republic of Belarus. The tournament originated in 2019, when the best teams of Russia, Belarus and Ukraine decided to found a competition called the East European Super League. The list of prospective participants included three Russian teams - Moscow Spartans and St. Petersburg Griffins and Northern Legion, two Ukrainian teams - Kyiv Capitals and Patriots, as well as two Belarusian teams - Minsk Zubrs and Litvins.

Unfortunately, by the start of the season in the spring of 2019, three Russian teams and Belarusian Litvins had remained in the tournament bracket. The first champion of the Eastern European Super League were the Moscow Spartans, who defeated the Northern Legion in the final.

Since 2020, almost all competitions in the Russian Federation have been held under the auspices of the East European Super League:

Super League - Russian American Football Championship - the number of its participants has grown up to 6 (but later reduced back to 5).
 The Open League of the Black Earth Region changed its name to National Major League - Russian Football Cup - the number of participants increased up to 19.
 Volga Bowl changed its name to First League - Russian American Football Championship in the 9x9 format - the number of participants has grown up to 16 teams.

Format 
The 2019 season was a round robin, the teams spent 6 games each in the regular season and 2 games in the playoffs (semi-final, match for third place and final). The tournament was held from April to July. The winner of the first ever Super League was the Spartans team from Moscow., who won the league championship in the first time in its history.

Super League is a round robin tournament in which teams meet each other once. 

National Major League - group stage + playoffs. Teams are divided into 6 divisions. All divisions, except for the Far East division, have in mind a circular meeting system.

League One - group stage + playoffs. Teams are divided into 4 divisions.

2019 Season Clubs

2020 Season Clubs

Super League

National Major League

First League

Finals

Winners

References

External links 
 
 

American football competitions
Sport in Belarus
American football in Russia
Professional sports leagues in Belarus
Professional sports leagues in Russia
Multi-national professional sports leagues